Nikolaos Gyzis (1 March 1842 – 4 January 1901) was considered one of Greece's most important 19th century painters. He was most famous for his work Eros and the Painter, his first genre painting. It was auctioned in May 2006 at Bonhams in London, being last exhibited in Greece in 1928. He was the major representative of the Munich School, the major 19th-century Greek art movement.

Life 

Gyzis was born in the village of Sklavochori, on the island of Tinos which has a long artistic history. As his family settled in Athens in 1850, he soon embarked on a study at the Athens School of Fine Arts. His studies there formed the foundation of his artistic education and helped him to develop his natural skill in painting.

In 1865, having won a scholarship, he went to continue his studies at the Academy of Fine Arts, Munich, where he settled for the rest of his life. He was very soon incorporated into the German pictorial climate, and became one of its most characteristic representatives of the Greek artistic movement of the Munich School. This is expressed in the painting News of Victory of 1871, which deals with the Franco-Prussian War, and the painting Apotheosis i Thriamvos tis Vavarias (Apotheosis or Triumph of Bavaria).

From 1886 onward he was professor at the Academy of Fine Arts, Munich, and gradually turned from the detailed realistic depictions towards compositions of a singularly impressionistic character. His students included Jan Vochoc, Ernst Oppler, Fritz Osswald, Anna May-Rychter, and Stefan Popescu (Romanian painter).

At the beginning of the 1870s returned to Greece for a period of several years, after which he produced a sequence paintings with more avowedly Greek themes, such as the Carnival at Athens and the Arravoniasmata (Engagement Ceremony) and a little later the painting After the Destruction of Psara. Towards the end of his life, in the 1890s, he took a turn toward more religious themes, with his best known work of the later period being Triumph of Religion. Gyzis died in Munich.

Legacy
His works are today exhibited at museums and private collections in Greece, Germany, and elsewhere.

Gyzis' painting The Secret School was depicted on the reverse of the Greek 200 drachmas banknote of 1996–2001.

The Athenian neighbourhood Gyzi is named for him.

Gallery

See also
 Munich School
 National Gallery of Athens
 Art in modern Greece
 Greek Art
 Emfietzoglou Gallery

References

External links

 Nikolaos Gyzis's The Secret School and an Ongoing National Discourse by Antonis Danos
 National Gallery of Greece
 Gallery of Paintings by Nikolaos Gyzis

1842 births
1901 deaths
Greek artists
Academic staff of the Academy of Fine Arts, Munich
Academy of Fine Arts, Munich alumni
People from Tinos
19th-century Greek painters
Munich School